Point Riche Lighthouse, located in Port au Choix, Newfoundland in Canada's Newfoundland and Labrador province, is a "pepperpot" lighthouse that was built in 1892 and is still active. The white wooden tower is octagonal pyramidal in shape, the lantern room is painted red. It is maintained by the Port au Choix National Historic Site.

The keeper's dwelling burned down in the 1970s.

Keepers
Eugene Roy 1871–1881 
Ferdinand Lemieux 1881–1896 
Narcisse Breton 1896–1926 
Joseph N. Romeo Breton 1926–1927 
Joseph Narcisse Gaudias Breton 1927–1959 
John Lawrence Rumbolt 1959–at least 1962

See also
List of lighthouses in Newfoundland and Labrador
 List of lighthouses in Canada

References

External links

 Aids to Navigation Canadian Coast Guard

Lighthouses completed in 1892
Lighthouses in Newfoundland and Labrador